Francisca Sanopal (born 1931) is a Filipino hurdler. She competed in the women's 80 metres hurdles at the 1956 Summer Olympics.

References

1931 births
Living people
Athletes (track and field) at the 1956 Summer Olympics
Filipino female hurdlers
Olympic track and field athletes of the Philippines
Place of birth missing (living people)
Asian Games medalists in athletics (track and field)
Asian Games gold medalists for the Philippines
Asian Games silver medalists for the Philippines
Athletes (track and field) at the 1958 Asian Games
Athletes (track and field) at the 1962 Asian Games
Medalists at the 1958 Asian Games
Medalists at the 1962 Asian Games